New Mexico State Road 554 (NM 554) is a  long state highway in northern New Mexico, located in the Southwestern United States. NM 554 is located on the southern slope of the Tusas Mountains. The highway starts East of Abiquiú at an intersection with U.S. Route 84, crossing the Rio Chama, then paralleling El Rito creek, passing through the village of El Rito, and ending Northwest of Ojo Caliente at an intersection with NM 111.

Major intersections

See also

References

External links
 

554
Transportation in Rio Arriba County, New Mexico